Vincent Carsten Maria Müller (born 23 August 2000) is a German professional footballer who plays as a goalkeeper for MSV Duisburg.

Career

Early career
After taking his first steps in youth football with local club SG Köln-Worringen, Cologne native Müller was accepted into the 1. FC Köln youth academy at the age of six.

Müller grew into first choice in goal in both the U17 and U19 teams of Die Geißböcke. With the U19 team, he finished third in the Under 19 Bundesliga West group in his final season and narrowly missed participation in the final round of the championship. That season he also appeared twice for the reserve team in the Regionalliga despite being a backup to Jan-Christoph Bartels and Brady Scott.

Würzburger Kickers
For the 2019–20 season, 19-year-old Müller signed a two-year contract with 3. Liga club Würzburger Kickers. From early-October onwards, Müller, originally planned as the third goalkeeper, replaced regular starter in goal Eric Verstappen, who had conceded 27 goals by then. Müller featured as a starter from then on and kept a clean sheet for four games, but broke his jaw on 2 June 2020 in a 0–1 home loss to 1. FC Magdeburg which sidelined him for two games. From 13 June and until the end of the season, Müller would continue as the starter in goal for the Kickers, keeping a clean sheet twice. Würzburger Kickers won promotion to the 2. Bundesliga at the end of the season.

PSV
After signing Fabian Giefer, who won the starting spot in goal in pre-season for Würzburg, Müller moved to Dutch Eredivisie club PSV in late-September 2020. There, he was united with German head coach Roger Schmidt and three other compatriots, including fellow goalkeeper Lars Unnerstall.

MSV Duisburg
Müller joined 3. Liga club MSV Duisburg on 21 June 2022, signing a two-year contract. He made his competitive debut for the club on the opening day of the 2022–23 season, playing the full game as his club lost 1–0 to VfL Osnabrück. On 21 August 2022, he scored the second goal in a 3–0 victory against SV Meppen, with a free-kick from his own half.

Career statistics

References

External links

Living people
2000 births
Footballers from Cologne
Association football goalkeepers
German footballers
German expatriate footballers
1. FC Köln II players
Würzburger Kickers players
PSV Eindhoven players
Jong PSV players
MSV Duisburg players
3. Liga players
Regionalliga players
Eerste Divisie players
Expatriate footballers in the Netherlands
German expatriate sportspeople in the Netherlands
21st-century German people